John McFarland (born April 2, 1992) is a Canadian former professional ice hockey winger who played in the National Hockey League (NHL) with the Florida Panthers. He was taken first overall in the 2008 Ontario Hockey League (OHL) Priority Selection by the  Sudbury Wolves. He was selected by the Panthers in the second round, 33rd overall, of the 2010 NHL Entry Draft. McFarland retired from professional hockey on February 6, 2019. In 2021, he was hired as an assistant coach for the OHL's Kingston Frontenacs.

Playing career
In 2007, McFarland was turned down in his request to play in the OHL because of a Hockey Canada provision. Instead McFarland played the 2007–08 season with the Toronto Jr. Canadiens, where he accumulated 165 points, with 96 goals, and 69 assists. McFarland was named the tournament's most valuable player at the 2008 OHL Showcase tournament, where he captained the Jr. Canadiens to an OHL Cup win.

The Sudbury Wolves drafted McFarland first overall in the 2008 OHL Priority Selection. McFarland was the winner of the Jack Ferguson Award, which the OHL presents annually to the player picked first overall in the OHL Priority Selection. He then signed with the Wolves in August 2008. McFarland played his first OHL game on September 19, 2008. McFarland scored his first goal in the OHL on October 17, 2008 against goaltender Trevor Cann from the Peterborough Petes in a 5–4 win. He then went on to win the OHL Rookie of the Month for October 2008, finishing the month with 5 goals and 6 assists for 11 points in 12 games.

McFarland was drafted by the Florida Panthers 33rd Overall in the 2010 NHL Entry Draft.

On December 9, 2010, Sudbury traded McFarland (along with defenseman Ben Chiarot and a third-round pick in 2011) to the Saginaw Spirit in exchange for Michael Sgarbossa, Alex Racino, Frank Schumacher and a fourth-round pick.

After four seasons as a professional within the Florida Panthers organization, McFarland left as a free agent to sign a one-year contract with Finnish club, SaiPa of the top-tier Liiga on July 24, 2016.

McFarland spent two seasons abroad, with SaiPa of Finland and Swiss second division outfit HC La Chaux-de-Fonds before opting to return to North America as a free agent, and later securing a one-year AHL contract with the Bakersfield Condors, an affiliate to the Edmonton Oilers, on August 1, 2018. In the 2018–19 season, McFarland opened the campaign with the Condors before he was reassigned to ECHL affiliate, the Wichita Thunder. He registered 4 assists in 10 games with the Thunder, before returning to the Condors. On February 1, 2019, McFarland was released from his contract with the Condors after opting to retire from professional hockey.

International play

During his rookie season in the OHL, McFarland competed for Team Ontario in the 2009 World U-17 Hockey Challenge on Vancouver Island where his Team Canada won the gold medal. He was the tournament scoring leader, with a total of 12 points, and was also on the tournament all-star team.

McFarland was named captain when he played for Team Canada at the 2009 Ivan Hlinka Memorial Tournament

Career statistics

Regular season and playoffs

International

Awards and honours

References

External links

1992 births
Living people
Bakersfield Condors players
Canadian ice hockey centres
Canadian expatriate ice hockey players in Finland
Canadian expatriate ice hockey players in Switzerland
Cincinnati Cyclones (ECHL) players
Florida Panthers draft picks
Florida Panthers players
Ice hockey people from Ontario
HC La Chaux-de-Fonds players
Ottawa 67's players
Portland Pirates players
Sportspeople from Richmond Hill, Ontario
Saginaw Spirit players
SaiPa players
San Antonio Rampage players
Sudbury Wolves players
Wichita Thunder players